Faridpur-3 is a constituency represented in the Jatiya Sangsad (National Parliament) of Bangladesh since 2008 by Khandaker Mosharraf Hossain of the Awami League.

Boundaries 
The constituency encompasses Faridpur Sadar Upazila.

History 
The constituency was created for the first general elections in newly independent Bangladesh, held in 1973.

Ahead of the 2008 general election, the Election Commission redrew constituency boundaries to reflect population changes revealed by the 2001 Bangladesh census. The 2008 redistricting altered the boundaries of the constituency.

Members of Parliament

Elections

Elections in the 2010s 
Khandaker Mosharraf Hossain was re-elected unopposed in the 2014 general election after opposition parties withdrew their candidacies in a boycott of the election.

Elections in the 2000s

Elections in the 1990s

References

External links
 

Parliamentary constituencies in Bangladesh
Faridpur District